Scouting started in Victoria, Australia, as early as 1907 and local Boy Scout patrols and troops formed independently. Several separate central organisations began operating including Boys' Brigade Scouts, Church Lads' Brigade Scouts, Chums Scouts, Imperial Boy Scouts, Girl Peace Scouts, Imperial Boy Scouts Victoria Section, Imperial Boy Scouts Victorian Section, Gippsland Boy Scouts Association, Australian Boy Scouts, Australian Imperial Boy Scouts, The Boy Scouts Association, Life-Saving Scouts of the Salvation Army and Methodist Boy Scouts.

Current scouting organisations in Victoria include Scouts Victoria, Russian Scouts, Polish Scouting Association ZHP, Plast Ukrainian Scouts, Hungarian Scouts, Lithuanian Scouts and Estonian Scouts, the Ethnic Scouts and Guides Association of Victoria (ESGAV), Girl Guides Victoria and the Assemblies of God Royal Rangers and Salvation Army's Guards and Legion (SAGALA).

History
"The cradle of Scouting in Victoria was the Tooronga Rd. State School, Caulfield; where in late 1907 one of the pupils, Roy McIndoe, received from a friend in England, who had been a member of the experimental camp at Brownsea Island, some pamphlets which had been issued by the Chief. These he showed to his mates who immediately got red shirts, their father's old felt hats, formed 'patrols' and 'whooped round the place like Red Indians'. Later in 1908 when they received the first copies of Scouting for Boys, they settled down to genuine Scouting."

It is unclear which was the first Scout troop in Victoria, but by the end of 1908, there were 11 Scout Troops in Victoria. In the early years, a number of central Scout organisations existed in Victoria (see Scouting and Guiding in Australia).

Scouts Australia - Victorian Branch

Scouts Victoria is a branch of Scouts Australia that delivers its programs in Victoria for children and youths from the ages of 6 to 26. In 1923, The Boy Scouts Association of the United Kingdom formed a branch in Victoria which was incorporated in 1932 and, upon the formation of The Scout Association of Australia in 1958, became its Victorian branch. The Branch is currently divided into eleven Regions: Bays, Eastern, Gippsland, Lerderderg, Loddon Mallee, Melbourne, Mt Dandenong, Northern, West Coast, and Western. From 2007 to 2019, Scouts Victoria experienced a resurgence. Some Scouts Victoria scout groups cater mostly to specific ethnic groups, such as 6th Box Hill (Greek) and The 5th Melbourne/1st Latvian Scout Group which is part of the Latvian Scouts organisation and is also registered with Scouts Australia.

Major Scouts Victoria events include the Kangaree for Joey Scouts (held every two years at Lardner Park), the Cuboree for Cub Scouts (held every three years at Gilwell Scout Park), Stradbroke Cup and BayJam for Scouts, Anything Goes, Victorian Gathering and Hoadley Hide for Venturer Scouts, and Surfmoot and Mudbash for Rover Scouts.

In 2007, Scouts Victoria hosted the 21st Australian Scout Jamboree (AJ2007) in Elmore. In 2014, four universities (La Trobe University, Victoria University, Federation University and Australian Catholic University) established recognition of the Queen's Scout Award (the peak award in the Venturer Scouts section) for university entry purposes. In February 2015, thousands of Victorian Scouts participated in Big Day Scout, which involved a citywide social media scavenger hunt for Scouting street art across Melbourne. Following the scavenger hunt, Shane Jacobson (an Australian actor and former Scout) was invested as Chief Scout of Victoria at the Myer Music Bowl in front of 15,000 Scouts and their families. It was the first time any Chief Scout in Australia, a figurehead role, was not a state governor.

Michael Baden-Powell, 4th Baron Baden-Powell (grandson of the founder of Scouting Robert Baden-Powell), is Scouts Victoria's State Commissioner for Special Duties.

Training sections
 Joey Scouts (aged 5–7 years)
 Cub Scouts (aged 8–10 years)
 Scouts (aged 11–14 years)
 Venturer Scouts (aged 15–17 years)
 Rover Scouts (aged 18–25)

Adventurous activities
Scouts Victoria operates a number of adventurous activities teams and members can gain Outdoor Recreation Certificate II and III qualifications. The teams are:
 Abseiling
 Air Activities
 Amateur Radio
 Bushwalking
 Canoeing & Kayaking
 Caving
 Four Wheel Driving
 Rafting
 Rock-climbing
 Ropes - including High Ropes, Rope Bridges, Aerial Runways 
 Sailing and Power-Boating
 Scuba diving
 Ski touring
 Survival
 Water skiing

Gilwell Park
Gilwell Park, named after the original Gilwell Park in the United Kingdom, is a campsite, activity and training centre for Scouts Victoria. The  property is located on both sides of the Launching Place Road, Gembrook. Charles Hoadley was one of the founders and the warden from 1924 until his death in 1947. In 1920, the first leader training course was held at what would become Gilwell Park, after it was donated to The Scout Association. Robert Baden-Powell approved the naming of the new training centre and visited it twice, in 1931 and again in 1935. One of the features of the park is the Chief's Gate, built specially for Baden-Powell, which guards the entrance to The Chief's Approach. Other locations include The Gauntlet Commando course — built for the World Rover Moot and the Lochan, a lake that is famously freezing all year round — even in the depths of summer. The EM Derrick Pack Holiday Centre, a bunkhouse and hall/kitchen that is primarily used by Cub Packs for their Pack Holidays, as well as for training courses, and the Hoadley and deMolnar Training Areas are dedicated to Wood Badge Training, though like most buildings they are open for hiring. Gilwell Park is home to the tri-annual Victorian Cuboree, a five-day camp that hosts thousands of Cub Scouts as well as hundreds of Leaders, Venturers and Rovers. In 2012 a high ropes challenge course, funded by the Victorian State Government, was opened. Two films have been made at Gilwell Park: the 2008 Australian film Dying Breed and the 2009 film Where the Wild Things Are. Gilwell Park is currently the subject of attempts to make it financially viable by attempting to make it more attractive to schools and groups for use during the week .

Chief Commissioners of Scouts Victoria
 1909–1911 Eyrl Lister DSO, VD, Chief Scoutmaster of the Imperial Boy Scouts
 1911–1917 W.E. Wears CE, Chief Scoutmaster of the Imperial Boy Scouts, Victorian Section
 1917 J.E. Jenkins
 1917–1918 L.H. Fairnie
 1918–1919 Donald McDonald
 1919–1921 Harold Cohen CMG, DSO
 1921–1923 V.J. Whitehead
 1923–1928 C.P. Middleton
 1928–1937 Charles Hoadley CBE, Polar Medal (Hoadley Hide annual Venturers event is named in his honour)
 1937–1951 G.W.S. Anderson MBE
 1952–1958 Roy Nichols CMG, OBE
 1958–1962 Robert Risson KB, CBE, DSO, OST J, ED
 1963–1968 Rolf McKellar OBE
 1968–1976 Jim Butchart OBE
 1976–1979 Norm Johnson OBE
 1979–1986 Neil Westaway AM
 1986–1992 William Wells AM
 1992–2001 John Ravenhall AM
 2001–2008 Alston Park AM
 2008–2014 Bob Taylor AM
 2014–2020 Brendan Watson OAM
 2020– Rod Byrnes

Ethnic Scouts associations
Russian Scouts, Polish Scouting Association ZHP, Plast Ukrainian Scouts, Hungarian Scouts, Lithuanian Scouts and Estonian Scouts associations operate in Victoria and were formed in the 1940s as scouts in exile associations. In the late 1940s these associations formed the Ethnic Scout and Guide Association of Victoria (ESGAV).

Girl Guides Victoria
Girl Guides Victoria is a member organisation of Girl Guides Australia. Guides follow the programme approved at national level. Girl Guides Victoria is divided into twenty-six regions. Lone Guiding also operates in Victoria.

The Florence Nightingale Girl Aids were established in 1909, by Wynifred Gipps, and were recognised as Baden-Powell Girl Guides in 1911. Originally refused a warrant as a Guide Leader as being too young, when Gipps reached the age of 21, in April 1912, she became the first warranted Guide Leader in Australia. On 6 February 1911, the 1st Hawthorn Company was formed, led by Louie Kerr. This Company claims to the first in Australia with the full name "Baden-Powell Girl Guides". A Guiding organisation for Victoria was formalised in 1921 and the first State Commissioner was Lady Stradbroke.

Girl Guides in Victoria are taking the pledge to Stand Against Poverty, and meet and exceed the Millennium Development Goals.

State Commissioners
 1922–1926 Helena, Lady Stradbroke
 1926–1931 Finola, Lady Somers
 1931–1948 Lady Chauvel
 1948–1953 Beverley Orr
 1953–1958 Margaret Curtis-Otter
 1958–1963 Irene Fairbairn
 1963–1968 Lady Joyce Price
 1968–1973 Charlotte Renshaw Jones
 1973–1978 Joan Grimwade
 1978–1983 Marjorie West
 1983–1988 Maren Chandler
 1988–1993 Dorothy Woolley
 1993–1998 Heather Barton
 1998–2003 Jane Scarlett
 2003–2008 Ellen Boyd
 2008–2011 Noella Kershaw
 2011        – Margaret Devlin (only served one year due to the restructuring of Girl Guides Victoria)
 2012–2013 Robinette Emonson

State badge
By 1926, the state badge was a sprig of wattle in enamel. An appeal was made for alternative designs and in 1927, a new design was chosen. Margaret Moore, a Guider and Commissioner suggested the design and it was drawn by Dorothea Holtz. The design was the Southern Cross on a blue lozenge surmounted by a crown. The same badge is currently still in use.

Properties
Several of Girl Guides Victoria's properties are owned and/or managed in conjunction with Scouts Australia. These include Lockington, Bungle Boori and the Guide-Scout Water Activities Centre. The headquarters was named the Joyce Price Centre in honour of the only Australian to be chairman of the World Association of Girl Guides and Girl Scouts.

Britannia Park

Britannia Park is a campsite belonging to Girl Guides Victoria. It is located near Yarra Junction in Victoria, Australia. It is 72 km east of Melbourne.

Burnet Park
Burnet Park is a campsite located between Traralgon and Morwell. There are three campsites and Illangi - the house on the hill, with accommodation for 29. There is also a tree house platform.

The site was part of Burnet's farm and was donated to the Guiding movement by the Burnet family for camping and outdoor recreation.

Guide-Scout Water Activities Centre
The Guide-Scout Water Activities Centre is located on Port Philip Bay. Activities include sailing, canoeing and paddle-boarding.

Lady Stradbroke Cup
The Lady Stadbroke Cup is an annual competition and the winners are presented with the Lady Stradbroke Cup. The cup was presented to the then Girl Guides Association of Victoria by Lady Stradbroke in 1926.

Women of Note and the Blue and Gold Society
The purpose of the Blue and Gold Society is to promote Guiding in the community. This is achieved by events such as cocktail parties with guest speakers. Membership of the society is open to both men and women.

Women of Note is a group of exceptional women, often professional women or business women, who support Girl Guides Victoria. They share their skills through the Girl Guides Victoria Mentor Program. Women of Note also hold Mentor Breakfasts across regional and metropolitan Melbourne. At these breakfasts, Year 11 students meet with the group to develop career networks.

Gang Shows and other theatrical experiences

 Melbourne Gang Show, - started in 1953. "Wonderful Life", by Ralph Reader, is used as its signature tune. From its 25th season through to its 49th, cast and crew would also sing "Touch of Silver" after the curtain came down on the final performance, but in 2002, for the 50th Melbourne Gang Show, this was replaced by "Golden Days" with lyrics by John Jenkins and music by Alexandra Boemo and this new song continues to be used in this way.
 Whitehorse Showtime, started in 1965, is presented by the Scouts and Guides of the Mount Dandenong Region. Currently, this is the largest Scout and Guide show in the Southern Hemisphere. Its signature song is "So As We Go Along" and cast and crew members wear a purple scarf.
 Camberwell Showtime, started in 1965, is written, directed and performed by the Scouts and Guides of Boroondara and has its signature song "scarves of blue" 
 Strzelecki Showtime, - started in 1969, is written and presented by Strzelecki District Scouts with local Guides (Latrobe Valley).
 Sunraysia Gang Show, - started in 1976, held in the state's North West.
 South Metro Showtime, - started in 1982 in Melbourne.

See also

 Baden-Powell Scouts' Association
 Glossary of Australian Scouting terms
 Kookaburra (song)
 John Russell Savige
 Scouting and Guiding in Australia

References

External links
 Scouts Australia Victorian Branch Web Site
 Scouts Australia National Web Site
 Girl Guides Victoria
 History of Scouting in Victoria
 Victorian Rovers
 Bogong Rover Chalet
 Girl Guides Victoria commercial
 Scouts Victoria Quality Teacher Program 
 Big Day Scout February 15, 2015 Shane Jacobson invested as Chief Scout of Victoria
 Chief Commissioner Scouts Victoria Brendan Watson OAM appointed

Victoria, Scouting in